Epanochori (Greek: Επανωχώρι) is a village in the municipal unit of Omala on the island of Cephalonia, Greece. It is located 10 km east of Argostoli and 15 km west of Poros.  Epanochori is located on the small road from Valsamata to Vlachata.  The village sits on the westernmost part of the Aenos range.

Historical population

References

Populated places in Cephalonia